Taylor Constantine Averill (born March 5, 1992) is an American professional volleyball player. He is a member of the US national team, and a bronze medalist at the 2018 World Championship. At the professional club level, he plays for Indykpol AZS Olsztyn.

Honours

Clubs
 National championships
 2020/2021  French Championship, with AS Cannes

Individual awards
 2021: French Championship – Best Middle Blocker

References

External links

 Player profile at TeamUSA.org
 
 Player profile at LegaVolley.it 
 Player profile at PlusLiga.pl 
 Player profile at Volleybox.net

1992 births
Living people
Sportspeople from Portland, Oregon
American men's volleyball players
American expatriate sportspeople in Italy
Expatriate volleyball players in Italy
American expatriate sportspeople in France
Expatriate volleyball players in France
American expatriate sportspeople in Poland
Expatriate volleyball players in Poland
Hawaii Rainbow Warriors volleyball players
AS Cannes Volley-Ball players
AZS Olsztyn players
Middle blockers